The International Medical Congress was a series of international scientific conferences on medicine that took place, periodically, from 1867 until 1913.

The idea of such a congress came in 1865, during the third annual Medical Congress of France; Professor Henri Giutrac proposed holding an international medical conference in 1867, taking advantage of the fact that physicians and surgeons from all over the world would surely be in Paris to attend that year's International Exhibition. The first congress was a great success; it enjoyed the patronage of the French Government, having been officially attended by Victor Duruy, Minister of Public Instruction, and had several honorary members selected from foreign diplomatic bodies and learned societies.

Congresses

Proposed Congress 
The 18th Congress was due to be held in Munich in 1917, as unanimously agreed by the permanent commission of the International Congress at the 17th Congress in 1913. The Bavarian government and the Ludwig Maximilian University of Munich offered to host it. In 1914, however, World War I began and the 18th Congress was cancelled.

References

Medical conferences